Hagerman Fossil Beds National Monument near Hagerman, Idaho, contains the largest concentration of Hagerman horse fossils in North America. The fossil horses for which the monument is famous have been found in only one locale in the northern portion of the monument called the Hagerman Horse Quarry. The  monument is internationally significant because it protects the world's richest known fossil deposits from the late Pliocene epoch, 3.5 million years ago. These plants and animals represent the last glimpse of that time that existed before the Ice Age, and the earliest appearances of modern flora and fauna. This is also significant because the fossils present during this period of the Pliocene represent species which were alive during the early stages in the evolution of humans, albeit on a different continent. The fossil beds were designated a National Natural Landmark in 1975 and was reclassified as a National Monument in 1988.

In 2021, Hagerman Fossil Beds entered a 25-year partnership with the Idaho Department of Parks and Recreation, which manages the six units of Thousand Springs State Park. The new Thousand Springs Visitor Center at the Billingsley Creek unit, opening in 2022, will feature all-new fossil exhibits and host ranger programs and other activities.

Notable fossils
 Hagerman horse, Equus simplicidens, formerly known as Plesippus shoshonensis
 Camelops, an extinct genus of camel that once inhabited North America
Many other species are also found in the fossil record, including mastodons, saber-toothed cats, and bone-crushing dogs (Borophaginae), as well as various species of fish, frog, vole and beaver.

See also
 National Parks in Idaho
 List of national monuments of the United States

References

External links
 
 
 Official Hagerman Fossil Beds National Monument website

National Park Service National Monuments in Idaho
Fossil museums
Fossil parks in the United States
Museums in Hagerman, Idaho
Natural history museums in Idaho
National Natural Landmarks in Idaho
Paleontology in Idaho
Protected areas of Gooding County, Idaho
Protected areas of Twin Falls County, Idaho
Neogene Idaho
Pliocene United States
Pliocene paleontological sites of North America
Protected areas established in 1988
1988 establishments in Idaho
1988 in paleontology
Natural history of Idaho